The white-spotted fantail or spot-breasted fantail (Rhipidura albogularis) is a small passerine bird. It is found in forest, scrub and cultivation in southern and central India. It was formerly considered a subspecies of the white-throated fantail.

Description
The adult white-spotted fantail is about 19 cm long. It has a dark fan-shaped tail, edged in white, and white supercilium and throat. Birds are mainly slate grey above, with a black eye mask, and a white throat and eyebrow. It has whitish underparts, and a grey breast band that is spotted white.

Behaviour

The white-spotted fantail lays three eggs in a small cup nest in a tree.

The white-spotted fantail is insectivorous, and often fans its tail as it moves through the undergrowth.

Not normally renowned as a songster, the male uses a fixed and unmistakable pattern of musical notes in its call. The notes are loud and normally divided into two stanzas – the first with 5–6 trilling notes rising and falling, followed by 4–5 notes rising up the scale and ending in the highest note.

Birds use the same song year after year, with progressively small changes, with the result that the song sounds very different after 4–5 years. The male's call is a valuable tool in detection and identification of the bird.

Gallery

References

white-spotted fantail
Birds of India
Endemic birds of India
white-spotted fantail
Taxa named by René Lesson